Brigadier Henry Joseph Patrick Baxter  (8 April 1921 – 10 January 2007) was an Irish  born fourth generation soldier who overcame the handicap of being blind in one eye to join the army and rose to command one of the largest and most controversial regiments in the British Army.

Indian Army
Harry Baxter was born a "child of the regiment" to the Royal Irish Fusiliers. Despite being blind in his right eye as the result of a childhood shooting accident in India, he was determined to join the army in 1939. The medical officer who tested him was impressed to meet someone who was trying to cheat his way "into" the army that he passed him fit for the Indian Army. He gave up a scholarship place at Oxford University and received an emergency commission as a 2nd Lt. in the Indian Army on 11 October 1942 with the number 363915. Baxter's service in India was mostly wartime and he served in Burma. His Emergency Commission was changed to a Permanent Commission in the British Army on 25 May 1946 when he joined the Royal Irish Fusiliers (RIrF) as a lieutenant.

Royal Irish Fusiliers
In 1947 Baxter transferred to the RIrF on a regular (permanent) commission and served in Palestine, Egypt, Greece, Germany and finally Malaya where he was Mentioned in Despatches During this time he spent four years on Extra Regimental Engagement (ERE) to Lord Mountbatten's staff.  Between 1963 and 1966 he was the commander of the North Irish Brigade's depot in Eglinton Camp County Londonderry and St Patrick's Barracks County Antrim and also spent a period as a staff officer with the Berlin Brigade before being appointed Brigadier UDR. He was appointed OBE in the 1968 Queen's Birthday Honours list.

George Medal
Baxter was awarded the George Medal for his actions at Gough Barracks, Armagh when, as a major, he and Captain Henry Chavasse removed a viable bomb from outside the armoury and drove it to a safe place for disposal.  The detonator of the bomb exploded whilst it was in transit but the device did not explode.

Ulster Defence Regiment
Baxter assumed command of the Ulster Defence Regiment (UDR) in April 1973 from Brigadier Denis Ormerod. Like Ormerod, Baxter was a Roman Catholic commanding a locally raised and predominantly Protestant regiment during a time of intercommunal strife.

He was in command during the notable Ulster Workers' Council strike in 1974 which was considered to be a "turning point" in the regiment's history and "coming of age" comments listed by Major John Potter in his unofficial history of the regiment.

Having a brigadier as regimental commander was unusual in the modern British Army but the size of the Ulster Defence Regiment with its 11 battalions and over 9,000 men and women (at its peak) demanded an officer of higher rank than colonel.

Baxter was the commander of the UDR at the time of the Miami Showband killings, when several soldiers of the regiment were involved in the killing of musicians outside the town of Banbridge.

He returned to the UDR in 1977 as Colonel Commandant of the regiment until 1986.

References

Bibliography
 
 
 

1921 births
2007 deaths
Military personnel from County Kilkenny
Commanders of the Order of the British Empire
Indian Army personnel of World War II
Recipients of the George Medal
British people in colonial India
Ulster Scots people
Ulster Defence Regiment officers
Royal Irish Fusiliers officers
British Army personnel of the Malayan Emergency
People from County Kilkenny
British Army brigadiers
British military personnel of the Palestine Emergency
People educated at Churcher's College
British Indian Army officers